The Columbus mayoral election of 1905 was the 55th mayoral election in Columbus, Ohio.  Incumbent Republican mayor Robert H. Jeffrey retired from office after one term.  Democratic party nominee De Witt C. Badger defeated Republican party nominee Winfield Scott Potter.

References

Bibliography

Mayoral elections in Columbus, Ohio
1905 Ohio elections
Columbus